Naim bey Frashëri, more commonly Naim Frashëri (25 May 184620 October 1900), was an Albanian historian, journalist, poet, rilindas and translator who was proclaimed as the national poet of Albania. He is regarded as a pioneer of modern Albanian literature and one of the most influential Albanian cultural icons of the 19th century. 
 
Naim and his brothers Abdyl and Sami were born and raised in the village of Frashër at the southern slopes of the Tomorr Mountains. He became acquainted with numerous cultures and languages such as Arabic, Ancient and Modern Greek, French, Italian, Ottoman Turkish and Persian. He was one of the few men to whom the literary culture of the Occident and Orient was equally familiar and valuable.

Upon the death of his father, he and his family settled to Ioannina where he earned initial inspiration for his future poetries written in the lyric and romantic style. After he suffered a severe lung infection, due to his congenital tuberculosis, in Constantinople, he joined his brother Abdyl in the fight for national freedom and consciousness of the Albanian people during the Albanian Renaissance in which he later became the most distinguished representative of that period.

Frashëri's masterpieces explored themes such as freedom, humanity, unity, tolerance and revolution. His extant works include twenty two works, composed of fifteen works written in Albanian as well as four in Turkish, two in Greek and one in Persian, accessible to an audience beyond Albania. He is the most representative writer of sufi poetry in Albanian, being under the influence of his uncle Dalip Frashëri, he tried to mingle sufism with western philosophy in his poetical ideals. He had an extraordinarily profound impact on the Albanian literature and society during the 20th century, most notably on Asdreni, Gjergj Fishta and Lasgush Poradeci, among many others.
 
Ti Shqipëri, më jep nder, më jep emrin Shqipëtar, a memorable line in his poem O malet e Shqipërisë, has been designated as the national motto of Albania. It speaks to unity, freedom and it embodies in its words a sense of pride towards the country and people.

Life

Family 

Naim Frashëri was born on 25 May 1846 into a wealthy Albanian family of religious belief affiliated with the Bektashi tariqa of Islam, in the village of Frashër in what was then part of the Ottoman Empire and now Albania. He, Abdyl and Sami were one of eight children of Halid Frashëri (1797–1859), a landowner and military commander and Emine (1814-1861). Halid belonged to the Dakollari branch of the Frashëri family. They were descendants of Ajaz Bey from Gramsh who in 1650-60 was given the command of Frashër. Ajaz Bey's grandfather, Hamza Bey had lost his lands in Tomorrica in 1570 when he rebeled and was exiled but the family's fortunes changed with the rise of Köprülü Mehmed Pasha who intervened on their behalf and they were pardoned. Emine came from the family of Iljaz Bej Mirahori from the region around Korçë that traced its ancestry back to the 15th century.

Education 

His religion paved the way for much of his future accomplishments.

In the Tekke of Frashër, he received lessons in all the common subjects of his time especially in languages such as Arabic, Ottoman Turkish and Persian. As a member of a family which gave him a strong Bektashi upbringing, he spent a part of his time in a Bektashi tekke. After the death of their parents, the family moved to Ioannina in 1865. The eldest brother, Abdyl (b. 1839), became the family head at the age of 22 and started working as a merchant. That year Naim and Sami enrolled in the Zosimaia secondary school. The education there provided Naim with the basics of a classical education along Western lines. Apart from languages he learned in the Zosiamaia (Ancient and Modern Greek, French and Italian), Naim took private lessons in Persian, Turkish and Arabic from two important local Bektashi.

After he finished his studies in 1870, Frashëri worked for a few months at the press office in Istanbul (1870) but was forced to return to his home village because of tuberculosis. The climate of Frashër helped Naim and soon he started work in the Ottoman bureaucracy as a clerk in Berat and later in Saranda (1872–1877). However, in 1876 Frashëri left the job and went to Baden, in modern Austria to cure his problems with rheumatism in a health resort.

Politics
In 1879, along with his brother Sami and 25 other Albanians, Naim Frashëri founded and was a member of the Society for the Publication of Albanian Writings in Istanbul that promoted Albanian language publications. Ottoman authorities forbid writing in Albanian in 1885 that resulted in publications being published abroad and Frashëri used his initials N.H.F. to bypass those restrictions for his works. Later on, Albanian schools were established in 1887 in Southeastern Albania.

An Albanian magazine, Drita, appeared in 1884 under the editorship of Petro Poga and later Pandeli Sotiri with Naim Frashëri being a behind the scenes editor as it was not allowed by Ottoman authorities to write in Albanian at that time. Naim Frashëri and other Albanian writers like his brother Sami Frashëri would write using pseudonyms in Poga's publication. Due to a lack of education material Naim Frashëri, his brother Sami and several other Albanians wrote textbooks in the Albanian language during the late 1880s for the Albanian school in Korçë. In a letter to Faik Konitza in 1887, Frashëri expressed sentiments regarding the precarious state of the Ottoman Empire that the best outcome for Albanians was a future annexation of all of Albania by Austria-Hungary.

In 1900 Naim Frashëri died in Istanbul. During the 1950s the Turkish government allowed for his remains to be sent and reburied in Albania.

Career

Works 
 

With its literary stature and the broad range both stylistic and thematic of its content, Frashëri significantly contributed to the development of the modern Albanian literary language. The importance of his works lies less in his creative expression than in the social and political intention of his poetry and faith. His works were noted by the desire to the emergence of an independent Albanian unity that overcomes denominational and territorial differences, and by an optimistic belief in civilization and the political, economic and cultural rise of the Albanian people.
 
In his poem Bagëti e Bujqësi, Frashëri idyllically describes the natural and cultural beauty of Albania and the modest life of its people where nothing infringes on mystical euphoria and all conflicts find reconciliation and fascination.
 
Frashëri saw his liberal religion as a profound source for Albanian libration, tolerance and national awareness among his religiously divided people. He, therefore, composed his theological Fletore e Bektashinjet which is now a piece of national importance. It contains an introductory profession of his faith and ten spiritual poems granting a contemporary perspective into the beliefs of the sect.
 
Kavâid-i farisiyye dar tarz-i nevîn (Grammar of the Persian language according to the new method), Istanbul, 1871.
Ihtiraat ve kessfiyyat (Inventions and Discoveries), Istanbul, 1881.
Fusuli erbea (Four Seasons), Istanbul, 1884.
Tahayyülat (Dreams), Istanbul, 1884.
Bagëti e Bujqësi (Herds and Crops), Bucharest, 1886.
E këndimit çunavet (Reader for Boys), Bucharest, 1886.
Istori e përgjithshme për mësonjëtoret të para (General history for the first grades), Bucharest, 1886.
Vjersha për mësonjëtoret të para (Poetry for the first grades), Bucharest, 1886.
Dituritë për mësonjëtoret të para (General knowledge for the first grades), Bucharest, 1886.
O alithis pothos ton Skypetaron (The True Desire of Albanians), Bucharest, 1886.
Luletë e Verësë (Flowers of the Summer), Bucharest, 1890.
Mësime (Lessons), Bucharest, 1894.
Parajsa dhe fjala fluturake (Paradise and the Flying Word), Bucharest, 1894.
Gjithësia (Omneity), Bucharest, 1895.
Fletore e bektashinjët (The Bektashi Notebook), Bucharest, 1895.
O eros (Love), Istanbul, 1895.
Iliadh' e Omirit, (Homer's Iliad), Bucharest , 1896.
Histori e Skënderbeut (History of Skanderbeg), Bucharest, 1898.
Qerbelaja (Qerbela), Bucharest, 1898.
Istori e Shqipërisë (History of Albania), Sofia, 1899.
Shqipëria (Albania), Sofia, 1902.

Legacy 

The prime representative of Romanticism in Albanian literature, Frashëri is considered by many to be the most distinguished Albanian poet of the Albanian Renaissance whose poetry continued to have a tremendous influence on the literature and society of the Albanian people in the 20th century. He is also widely regarded as the national poet of Albania and is celebrated as such among the Albanian people in Kosovo, Montenegro, North Macedonia and other Albanian-inhabited lands in the Balkans. 

After his death, Frashëri became a great source of inspiration and a guiding light for the Albanian writers and intellectuals of the 20th century amongst them Asdreni, Gjergj Fishta, Mitrush Kuteli and Lasgush Poradeci. His great work such as Bagëti e Bujqësi, Gjuha Jonë and Feja promoted national unity, consciousness, and tolerance in the breasts of his countrymen an enthusiasm for the culture and history of their ancestors. 

Albanians of the Bektashi faith were in particular influenced and motivated by his work. Himself a Bektashi, he desired purity of the Albanian language and had attempted in his lifetime to Albanianise hierarchical terms of the order in his work Fletore e Bektashinjët which called for an Albanian Bektashism. His poem Bagëti e Bujqësi celebrated the natural beauty of Albania and the simple life of Albanian people while expressing gratitude that Albania had bestowed upon him "the name Albanian". In Istori' e Skënderbeut, he celebrated his love for Albania by referring to the medieval battles between the Albanians and Ottomans while highlighting Skenderbeg's Albanian origins and his successful fight for liberation. In Gjuha Jonë, he called for fellow Albanians to honour their nation and write in Albanian while in another poem Feja, he pleaded with Albanians not make religious distinctions among themselves as they all were of one origin that speak Albanian.

Numerous organizations, monuments, schools, and streets had been founded and dedicated to his memory throughout Albania, Kosovo as well as to a lesser extent in North Macedonia and Romania. His family's house, where he was born and raised, in Frashër of Gjirokastër County is today a museum and was declared a monument of important cultural heritage. It houses numerous artefacts including handwritten manuscripts, portraits, clothing and the busts of him and his brothers Abdyl and Sami. 

Frashëri's portrait is depicted on the obverses of the 500 lekë banknote from 1992 to 1996 and since 1996 on the 200 lekë banknote. On the reverse side of the bill is a picture of his family house in Frashër. The Albanian nation has established an order of merit that bears his name which was awarded to, amongst others, the Albanian nun and missionary Mother Teresa.

Gallery

See also 
 List of Albanian writers
 Albanian Renaissance
 League of Prizren

References

Sources 

1846 births
1900 deaths
19th-century Albanian poets
19th-century Albanian writers
Albanian Sufis
Activists of the Albanian National Awakening
Muslim poets
Politicians of the Ottoman Empire
Romantic poets
Zosimaia School alumni
People from Gjirokastër County
Bektashi Order
Sufi poets
Civil servants from the Ottoman Empire
Albanians from the Ottoman Empire
Albanian-language poets
Albanian male poets
19th-century Albanian historians
Albanian translators
19th-century historians from the Ottoman Empire
Modern Greek-language writers
Turkish-language writers
19th-century translators
French–Albanian translators
Persian–Albanian translators
19th-century male writers
Naim
Naim
Albanian Arabic-language poets
Ottoman Arabic poets
Translators of the Quran into Albanian